Usnea filipendula, the fishbone beard lichen, is a pale gray-green fruticose lichen with a pendant growth form, growing in up to 20 cm many-branching tassels hanging from the bark of trees. In California, it mostly grows on mostly conifer in the Coast Range, but also in the western slopes of the Sierra Nevada range. It lacks apothecia. It is similar to Usnea scabrata, but is darker, has a thicker cortex, and different chemistry. Lichen spot tests are K+ red, KC−, C−, and P+ yellow.

References

filipendula
Lichen species
Lichens described in 1881
Lichens of Europe
Lichens of North America
Taxa named by James Stirton